Vijay Ghate (born 18 October 1964) is an Indian tabla player. He was awarded with "Padma Shri" award in 2014, the fourth highest civilian award by Government of India.

Early life
Ghate was born in Jabalpur, Madhya Pradesh. He started learning his art at an early age of three in Jabalpur. He then moved to Mumbai, and learned for over twelve years under Taalyogi Pandit Suresh Talwalkar.

Career
Vijay Ghate was personally chosen by Pandit Suresh Talwalker to play on his behalf in many concerts.
Ghate accompanied Indian classical musicians, including Hariprasad Chaurasia, Vilayat Khan, Pandit Jasraj, Kaushiki Chakrabarty, Shivkumar Sharma, Amjad Ali Khan, Shahid Parvez, and Vishwa Mohan Bhatt as well as Indian Classical Kathak dancers including Birju Maharaj and Nandkishore Kapote.

Ghate also collaborated with jazz guitarist, Larry Coryell and saxophonist, George Brooks.

TaalChakra
Taalchakra is a music festival started by Vijay Ghate and few others. This festival provides a platform for young musicians to perform. Different artists from various genres of music perform at the festival.

References

External links
 Pt. Vijay Ghate's Taalchakra Festival

1964 births
Hindustani instrumentalists
Living people
People from Jabalpur
Tabla players
Recipients of the Padma Shri in arts